Willie Isz is an American alternative hip hop duo comprising Khujo of Goodie Mob and Jneiro Jarel of Shape of Broad Minds. Their first album Georgiavania was released on Lex Records in 2009.

Discography

Albums 
 Georgiavania (2009, Lex Records)

Remixes 
 Massive Attack - "Atlas Air (Lavender Jungle Remix)" (2009)
 Maxwell - "Pretty Wings (Willie Isz Remix)" (2009)
 TV on the Radio - "Shout Me Out (Willie Isz Remix)" (2009)
 Maximum Balloon feat. Theophilus London - "Groove Me (Remix)"  (2010)

References

External links
 

Alternative hip hop groups
American hip hop groups
American musical duos
Musical groups established in 2006
Lex Records artists